Nachrichtendienst may refer to:

Allgemeiner Deutscher Nachrichtendienst, German Democratic Republic state news agency
Militärischer Nachrichtendienst, Swiss military intelligence agency
Strategischer Nachrichtendienst, Swiss foreign intelligence agency
Bundesnachrichtendienst, German foreign intelligence service
Nachrichtendienst, the Nazi German secret intelligence agency in the novels of Robert Ludlum